St. Carols is a settlement in the Canadian province of Newfoundland and Labrador.

References 

Populated places in Newfoundland and Labrador